Edward Barrett Warman (April 29, 1847 – November 26, 1931) was an American psychologist and health expert. He edited a column in the Los Angeles Times called "The Care of the Body", and he authored several books about physical culture. He advocated daily physical exercise.

Selected works

Warman, Edward B. (1897). Physical Training Simplified. American Sports Pub. Co.

References

External links
Edward B. Warman on the Internet Archive

1847 births
1931 deaths
20th-century American psychologists
People associated with physical culture
People from Los Angeles
People from Warren County, New Jersey
American health and wellness writers
Strength training writers